Câmara (meaning "chamber") is a common surname in the Portuguese language. It may also refer to:

People 
 António de Vasconcelos e Sousa Câmara Caminha Faro e Veiga, 8th Count of Calheta, 4th Marquis of Castelo Melhor and Constable of Portugal
 D. João da Câmara, Portuguese writer
 Eugênia Câmara, Portuguese actress
 Gilberto Câmara, Brazilian computer scientist
 Hélder Câmara, Brazilian archbishop
 Hélder Câmara (chess player), Brazilian chess master
 Joana Tomásia da Câmara, 14th and last donatary captain of the island of São Miguel, Portugal
 João Câmara, Brazilian painter
 Ronald Câmara, Brazilian chess master
 Sérgio Sette Câmara.  Brazilian racing driver
 José da Câmara Teles, 13th donatary captain of the island of São Miguel, Portugal
 Luís Manuel da Câmara, 12th donatary captain of the island of São Miguel, Portugal

Places 
 Câmara de Lobos, city and municipality in Madeira, Portugal
 Estreito de Câmara de Lobos, a parish in Madeira, Portugal

Other 
 Câmara Defense, also Gunderam Defense or Brazilian Defense is a rarely played chess opening
 TV Câmara, Brazilian television channel responsible for broadcasting activity from the Brazilian Chamber of Deputies
 Câmara may also mean Chamber of Deputies in a number of different countries
 Câmara may also mean a Câmara Municipal, the executive body of a municipality in Portugal, and legislative body of Brazilian municipalities

See also 
Camara (disambiguation)
Kamara (disambiguation)

Portuguese-language surnames